This is a list of secretaries of state of the United States.

Secretaries of foreign affairs (1781–1789)
On January 10, 1780, the Confederation Congress created the Department of Foreign Affairs.

On August 10, 1781, Congress selected Robert R. Livingston, a delegate from New York, as the first Secretary for Foreign Affairs.  Livingston was unable to take office until October 20, 1781.  He served until June 4, 1783, and was succeeded by John Jay on December 21, 1784, who served until March 4, 1789, when the government under the Articles of Confederation gave way to the government under the Constitution.

The office of Secretary of Foreign Affairs and the Department of Foreign Affairs were reinstated by a law signed by George Washington on July 27, 1789. John Jay retained the post on an interim basis, pending the return of Thomas Jefferson from France.

Secretaries of state
On September 15, 1789, before Jefferson could return to take the post, Washington signed into law another act which changed the name of the office from Secretary of Foreign Affairs to Secretary of State, changed the name of the department to the Department of State, and added several domestic powers and responsibilities to both the office of secretary and the department. Thomas Jefferson took office as the first Secretary of State on March 22, 1790.

List of secretaries of state by time in office 

This is a list of United States secretaries of state by time in office. This is based on the difference between dates; if counted by number of calendar days all the figures would be one greater. Cordell Hull is the only person to have served as Secretary of State for more than eight years. Daniel Webster and James G. Blaine are the only secretaries of state to have ever served non-consecutive terms. Warren Christopher served very briefly as Acting Secretary of State non-consecutively with his later tenure as full-fledged Secretary of State. Elihu B. Washburne served as Secretary of State for less than two weeks before becoming Ambassador to France.

Notes

References

Further reading
 Bemis, Samuel Flagg, ed. The American secretaries of state and their diplomacy (19 vol., 1963) scholarly biographies. partly online
 Graebner, Norman A., ed. An Uncertain Tradition: American Secretaries of State in the Twentieth Century (1961) scholarly essays on John Hay through John Foster Dulles. online
 Hopkins, Michael F. "President Harry Truman's Secretaries of State: Stettinius, Byrnes, Marshall and Acheson." Journal of Transatlantic Studies 6.3 (2008): 290–304.
 Mihalkanin Edward, ed. American Statesmen: Secretaries of State from John Jay to Colin Powell (2004);  short scholarly articles by experts; 572pp online

External links 

 |L
State, Secretary of
United States